PIK-26 Mini-Sytky is a low-wing monoplane, designed by the Finnish aircraft designer Kai Mellen. Its high performance allows it to cruise at 173 km/h while burning 7 litres/hour. 
Several aircraft of this design are now flying.

The PIK-26 is mainly constructed from wood. While the skins are made of birch plywood, and the spars of pine, the wing ribs are made of PVC foam. Construction time for the PIK-26 is about 2,300 hours.

Specifications (PIK-26 Mini-Sytky)

References

External links
Pik-26, Panu Kääriäinen
Pik-26, Built by Janne
Pik-26 Construction Forum

Homebuilt aircraft
PIK aircraft
Aircraft first flown in 1996
Low-wing aircraft
Single-engined tractor aircraft